Cullen Creek is a stream in Beaver County, Utah, United States.

Cullen Creek bears the name of Mat Cullen, a local prospector.

See also
List of rivers of Utah

References

Rivers of Beaver County, Utah
Rivers of Utah